Kormyansko is a village in the municipality of Sevlievo, in Gabrovo Province, in northern central Bulgaria.

Honours
Kormyansko Saddle in Graham Land, Antarctica is named after the village.

References

Villages in Gabrovo Province